The Republic of Korea military academies are military institutions for undergraduate education and training of commissioned officers of the Republic of Korea armed forces.

 Army - Korea Military Academy (육군사관학교)
 Army - Korea Army Academy at Yeongcheon (육군3사관학교)
 Navy - Korea Naval Academy (해군사관학교)
 Air Force - Korea Air Force Academy (공군사관학교)
 Armed Forces Nursing Academy (국군간호사관학교)